Andrew Michael Gill (born 19 June 1948), is a male former diver who competed for Great Britain and England.

Diving career
Gill represented Great Britain in the men's 10 metre platform at the 1972 Summer Olympics. He also represented England and won a bronze medal in the 10 metres platform, at the 1970 British Commonwealth Games in Edinburgh, Scotland.

While attending the Gorringe Park Secondary Modern School in 1962 he was instructed on the trampoline by his teacher Wally Clark and regarded as a promising diver.

References

1948 births
English male divers
Commonwealth Games medallists in diving
Commonwealth Games bronze medallists for England
Divers at the 1970 British Commonwealth Games
Divers at the 1972 Summer Olympics
Olympic divers of Great Britain
Living people
Medallists at the 1970 British Commonwealth Games